Cowboy Songs is a compilation recording released by the Western band Riders in the Sky in 1996. It is available as a single CD.

This album is a collection of 12 of the most widely known and popular songs of the west—performed in the tradition of the bands Sons of the Pioneers and the Riders of the Purple Sage.

Track listing
 "(I've Got Spurs That) Jingle Jangle Jingle" (Frank Loesser, J.J. Lilley) – 2:35
 "Tumbling Tumbleweeds" (Bob Nolan) – 3:30
 "Don't Fence Me In" (Cole Porter, Robert Fletcher) – 2:35
 "Cattle Call" (Tex Owens) – 2:48
 "(Ghost) Riders in the Sky" (Stan Jones) – 3:05
 "The Streets of Laredo (The Cowboy's Lament)" (Traditional) – 3:07
 "I Ride an Old Paint" (Traditional) – 2:15
 "Red River Valley" (Traditional) – 4:03
 "Rawhide" (Dimitri Tiomkin, Ned Washington) – 2:07
 "Chasin' the Sun" (Douglas B. Green) – 2:01
 "Back in the Saddle Again" (Gene Autry, Ray Whitley) – 2:14
 "Home on the Range" (Traditional) – 4:09

Personnel
 Douglas B. Green (a.k.a. Ranger Doug) – vocals, guitar
 Paul Chrisman (a.k.a. Woody Paul) – vocals, fiddle
 Fred LaBour (a.k.a. Too Slim) – vocals, bass
 Eddie Bayers – percussion
 Kenny Malone – percussion
 Kayton Roberts – pedal steel guitar
 Gregg Galbraith – guitar
 Tommy Goldsmith – guitar
 Mark Howard – guitar
 Rich O'Brien – guitar
 Paul Worley – guitar
 Tommy Wells – drums
 Carl Gorodetzky – violin
 Lee Larrison – violin
 Pamela Sixfin – violin
 Andrea Zonn – violin, viola

External links
 Riders in the Sky Official Website

1996 albums
Riders in the Sky (band) albums